Marc-Louis-Emmanuel Solon (1835 – 23 June 1913), pseudonym Miles, was a renowned French porcelain artist.  After beginning his career at the Sèvres Pottery, he moved to Stoke-on-Trent in 1870 to work at Mintons Ltd, where he became the leading exponent of the technique of ceramic decoration called pâte-sur-pâte. His work commanded high prices in the late Victorian period. 

Solon was born in Montauban, Tarn-et-Garonne. After moving to England at the time of the Franco-Prussian War he lived there for the rest of his life.

Family

Solon married Laure, the daughter of Minton's art director, Léon Arnoux, and the Solons raised a large family in The Villas near the Mintons factory. Their eldest son, Léon-Victor Solon (1872–1957), joined Minton in the 1890s and became art director (1900–1909).  Leon made an important contribution to art nouveau ceramics at Minton before moving to the United States. Other notable sons include Camille Solon and Albert Solon of Solon and Schemmel Tile Company.

Art
Despite some family resistance to his becoming an artist, he studied at the École des Beaux-Arts and with Horace Lecoq de Boisbaudran. Some of Solon's work came to the attention of the art director of the Sèvres Pottery.  Solon was employed at Sèvres from 1862–70 as a ceramic artist and designer and was where he learned and began to perfect the technique of pâte-sur-pâte. His styles were derived from Classical Greece, the Renaissance, 17th- and 18th-century paintings, and Victorian postcards while his subjects often included portraits, female figures, putti (cherubs), small animals, and birds. His early work was produced under the pseudonym Miles, said to be based on his initials M L E S. A number of these earlier pieces are housed in the Victoria and Albert Museum and in the collection of the former Minton Museum.

Solon moved from France to England in 1870 to flee from the Franco-Prussian War.  He found employment at Mintons Ltd, and settled at Nº1, The Villas, Stoke-on-Trent. Mintons had a history of employing foreign artists, starting with their first Frenchman in 1848, the art director Léon Arnoux, followed by other French artists such as the sculptor Albert-Ernest Carrier-Belleuse. While working at Mintons Solon became the leading expert in the pâte-sur-pâte technique. Mintons experienced more demand for pâte-sur-pâte ceramics than Solon could fulfill on his own so he trained a number of apprentices including Frederick Alfred Rhead and Alboin Birks. There ensued a golden age of pâte-sur-pâte in Stoke-on-Trent that stretched into the early years of the 20th century.

One of Solon's vases, believed to be his largest, is on display at Osborne House.

He died at Stoke-on-Trent on 23 June 1913.

Gallery

Literary interests

During his early years in Staffordshire Solon collected local pottery.  He used the collection as the basis of his 1883 publication, The Art of the Old English Potter, a book about pottery produced before Josiah Wedgwood transformed the industry.

Other publications include:
 A History and Description of the old French Faïence (London, 1903) 
 A History and Description of Italian Maiolica (London, 1907)
 Ceramic Literature (London, 1910)

He also collected books about ceramics and after his death, his library was acquired by the local technical college with funds provided by the Carnegie United Kingdom Trust.

References

External links

 Potteries Museum & Art Gallery Examples of pâte-sur-pâte are to be found in the Potteries Museum & Art Gallery in Hanley, Staffordshire, whose collection includes items from the former Minton museum. The website has a search facility which allows you to view images of pâte-sur-pâte (if you type in the keyword "Solon").
 Oxford Art Online entry

Book and manuscript collectors
Carnegie libraries in England
British potters
French potters
French emigrants to England
People from Montauban
1835 births
1913 deaths
Marc-Louis